Chrostosoma schausi is a moth of the subfamily Arctiinae. it was described by Walter Rothschild in 1911. It is found in Costa Rica, Panama and Ecuador.

References

Biodiversity Heritage Library

Chrostosoma
Moths described in 1911